Nguyễn Quang Hải (born 12 April 1997) is a Vietnamese professional footballer who plays as an attacking midfielder and winger for Ligue 2 club Pau and the Vietnam national team. In 2018 and 2019, he was nominated by a panel of sports journalists and football experts for the Best Footballer in Asia award.

Quang Hải, who was born in Đông Anh, joined Hanoi's youth academy at the age of nine. By 2013, he played in the under-19 league at the age of 16. From 2014 to 2022, Quang Hải played for Hanoi's senior team, including a loan spell at Saigon in 2015. He joined Ligue 2 club Pau in France in June 2022.

After playing for Vietnam at various youth levels, Quang Hải made his debut for the Vietnam national team in 2017. His first goal came against Cambodia in September 2017.

Club career

Hanoi
A product of the capital club Hanoi, Quang Hải made his professional debut in 2014 for the club. In just three years, he rose to become one of the most promising products of the club, winning the 2015 V.League 2 before repeating the feat in the 2016 V.League 1. Following a successful Vietnam run in 2018 AFC U-23 Championship, in which he demonstrated a stellar performance, he became a regular face of the club as he played a major role in the club's winning two consecutive V.League seasons in 2018 and 2019. He also helped the club to win two consecutive Vietnamese National Football Cup in 2019 and 2020.

In March 2022, he announced that he would leave the club, expressing his desire to go to Europe to cement his career. His last match for his home club came on 7 April 2022 when his club won 4–0 over Cong An Nhan Dan FC. Though not scoring, Quang Hải provided an assist in this win.

Pau 
On 29 June 2022, following numerous rumors about his future, Quang Hải joined Ligue 2 club Pau on a two-season contract, making him the first Vietnamese player to join a French football club. On 30 July 2022, he made his first league appearance for Pau, subbed on for Eddy Sylvestre in the 59th minute in the 4–0 away loss against En Avant Guingamp. On 8 October 2022, he scored his first goal for Pau in the 86th minute in a home match against Rodez in Ligue 2. He scored Pau's second goal of the match, after a brief 8-minute period of playing time, to tie the match 2–2. This scoreline remained to full-time.

International career

Under-16 to under-20 
Nguyễn Quang Hải was called up for the 2012 AFC U-16 Championship qualification at the age of only 14.

After an impressive performance in the 2014 under-19 National Championship, Quang Hải was called up to the national U19 side. He went on to represent the U19 team in the 2014 AFF U-19 Youth Championship and the Bruneian Hassanal Bolkiah Championship, where Vietnam finished as runner-up on both occasions.

He made a significant contribution in the 2016 AFC U-19 Championship campaign. In the second game against the United Arab Emirates, he assisted Hồ Minh Dĩ in Vietnam's opening goal. Vietnam went on to beat host Bahrain in the quarterfinal, thus qualified for the 2017 FIFA U-20 World Cup. This was Vietnam's first appearance in a youth FIFA World Cup tournament.

He captained the Vietnam U20 in the 2017 FIFA U-20 World Cup group stage matches against Honduras and France.

Under-23 national team
Quang Hải was first called up to the U23 national team for a friendly against the Malaysia U23 in February 2017. He was then included in the Vietnam squad for the 2017 Southeast Asian Games. In the decisive game against Thailand, he was on the bench for the first half, and immediately made an impact in the second one, being fouled by Ratthanakorn Maikami in the penalty area. Nguyễn Công Phượng, however, missed the spot-kick as Vietnam lost 3–0 and was eliminated.

The appointment of head coach Park Hang-seo saw a significant improvement in the under-23 team hierarchy, as Quang Hải started becoming untouchable in the team's front 3.  He was widely praised as a national hero during the historic 2018 AFC U-23 Championship campaign, as the Vietnam U23 upset major title contenders en route to their very first continental final.

Quang Hải had been instrumental for the team from the group stage, scoring both of the team's two goals. The one against Australia ensured him a Man of the match award. He also converted his penalty kick during the shootout in the quarterfinal against Iraq, thus securing Vietnam a spot in the semi-final. Quang Hải's performance against the Qatar in the semi-final was widely believed to be his most plausible. Quang Hải leveled the score with a low range half-volley in the 69th minute, only for Almoez Ali to regained Qatar's lead in the 87th. He immediately struck back, beautifully controlled the loose ball following a free-kick, then faking a shot to dribble past through two defenders flamboyantly before placing the shot into the far corner; all happened within a minute from the Almoez Ali's goal. He later missed his own in the penalty-shootout, but Vietnam ended up winning 4–3 and advanced to the final. In the final, Quang Hải once again impressed, equalized the score with a free-kick goal. The goal, nicknamed "rainbow in the snow" by the media, has become a symbol for the unprecedented emotional excitement brought to the Vietnamese people by the historic campaign, as well as the national spirit that goes with it. The goal was later voted as the goal of the tournament. Vietnam, however, lost to the Uzbekistan in the last minute of extra time.

He was widely considered to be one of the best players of the tournament, being inducted into several teams of the tournament by various sources. His ability to score from long range was one of the key technical talking points mentioned by the AFC. There were even aggressive criticisms by the Southeast Asian media towards the AFC for not awarding the Most Valuable Player to Quang Hải. At the end of the tournament, Quang Hải, along with teammate Bui Tien Dung, was awarded the 3rd class Labor Order for his impressive performance.

Quang Hải was named into Vietnam’s Asian Games 2018 lineup. Quang Hải scored one goal in Vietnam’s 3–0 win over Pakistan. In a match against Japan, he scored the only goal of the match as Vietnam defeated Japan to top the Group. Vietnam later went all the way to the semi-finals for the first time in their history at the Asian games, where they were defeated by South Korea 3–1. Vietnam later lost to the UAE in a penalty shootout in the Bronze Medal Match.

Quang Hải captained and scored one goal for Vietnam in the 2019 Southeast Asian Games in a 6–1 win against Laos before he was injured in a match against Singapore and missed the rest of the tournament. However, Vietnam still went on without him to defeat Indonesia in the final to win the gold medal, their first gold in the SEA games football competition since South Vietnam won in 1959.

Senior national team
On 13 June 2017, Quang Hải made his international debut for the Vietnam senior team, against Jordan, in a match that ended in a 0–0 draw. He scored his first senior goal for Vietnam against Cambodia on 5 September 2017, coming on as a substitute and scored a late winner.

In the 2018 AFF Suzuki Cup Quang Hải played every very minute but 2 as Vietnam won its first Southeast Asian football championship in ten years. In the first three games of the group stages, he was given a midfield position by head coach Park Hang-seo, which raised the question among the fans. In the last one against Cambodia, he reclaimed a slot in the front 3 and was immediately awarded Man of the match. He played as an advanced playmaker for the rest of the tournament, being awarded Man of the match twice. The first one was in the semi-final second leg against the Philippines, where he broke the deadlock and helped secure the first home win in the knockout phase of the AFF Championship for Vietnam. The last one was clinched as he assisted Nguyễn Anh Đức the winning goal in the final against the Malaysia. At the end of the tournament, he was a part of the team of AFF Cup's Best XI, and was chosen as the Most valuable player. He was honorably given the 2nd class Labor Order by Prime Minister Nguyễn Xuân Phúc. He won the Vietnamese Golden Ball few days later, thanks largely to his performance in the AFF Championship.

Quang Hải gained international reputation in 2019 AFC Asian Cup when he played an instrumental part on Vietnam's amazing run in the tournament, including a stunning free kick goal against Yemen as Vietnam won 2–0, and sneaked into the Knockout rounds. Vietnam defeated Jordan in the Round of 16, but fell short 1–0 to the eventual runners up of the tournament, Japan in the quarterfinals. Still, Quang Hải was named Man of the Match on both Vietnam's wins in the tournament, and was inducted into the tournament's official all-star squad by the AFC Technical Committee. On 8th November 2019, he defeated Chanathip Songkrasin of Thailand to win the AFF's Men Player of the year, an award for the best Southeast Asian player in recent two years. 

Quang Hải scored three goals in the 2022 FIFA World Cup qualification, which helped Vietnam to reach the final round of qualification for the first-time ever. 

He also scored two goals in 2020 AFF Championship.

Career statistics

International

Scores and results list Vietnam's goal tally first, score column indicates score after each Quang Hai goal.

International goals
Scores and results list Vietnam's goal tally first, score column indicates score after each Quang Hải goal.

Honours
Saigon
 V.League 2: 2015

Hanoi
 V.League 1: 2016, 2018, 2019.
 Vietnamese National Cup: 2019, 2020
 Vietnamese Super Cup: 2018, 2019, 2020

Vietnam U23
 AFC U-23 Asian Cup runners-up: 2018
 VFF Cup: 2018
 Asian Games fourth place: 2018
 Southeast Asian Games: 2019

Vietnam 
 AFF Championship: 2018; runners-up: 2022
VFF Cup: 2022

Individual
 AFF Championship Best XI: 2018
 AFF Championship MVP: 2018
 Vietnamese Golden Ball: 2018
 Vietnamese Silver Ball: 2019, 2021
 Vietnamese Bronze Ball: 2017
 Best young player V-League: 2017, 2018
 V.League 1 Player of the Season: 2019
 ASEAN Football Federation Best XI: 2019
 AFF Men’s Player of the Year: 2019
 AFC Asian Cup Team of the Tournament: 2019
 AFC Cup  All-time XI

References

External links

1997 births
Living people
Sportspeople from Hanoi
Vietnamese footballers
Association football midfielders
Vietnam international footballers
V.League 1 players
Ligue 2 players
Hanoi FC players
Pau FC players
2019 AFC Asian Cup players
Competitors at the 2017 Southeast Asian Games
Competitors at the 2019 Southeast Asian Games
Southeast Asian Games medalists in football
Southeast Asian Games gold medalists for Vietnam
Vietnamese expatriate footballers
Vietnamese expatriate sportspeople in France
Expatriate footballers in France